SiteMinder is a technology company offering an e-commerce platform that allows hotels to sell their rooms on their own websites and through third parties like online travel agencies. They're headquartered in Sydney, Australia, and are operating sales offices in London, Bangkok, Dallas, Galway, Berlin and Manila.

The company offers integrations with 230 hotel property management systems that hotels use to manage their room pricing and reservations. They also integrate with 350 third parties like global distribution systems, tour operators and online travel agencies that hotels can use to sell their rooms. They currently serve 35,000 hotel customers globally.

History   
The company procured investment from TCV, Bailador, Blackrock, Ellerston Capital and Fidelity International. On November 8, 2021, SiteMinder went public on the Australian Securities Exchange.

References 

Travel technology
2021 initial public offerings
Companies based in Sydney
Companies listed on the Australian Securities Exchange